Moldova competed at the 2022 World Games held in Birmingham, United States from 7 to 17 July 2022. Athletes representing Moldova won one gold medal and the country finished in 47th place in the medal table.

Medalists

Competitors
The following is the list of number of competitors in the Games.

Dancesport

Moldova won one gold medal in dancesport.

References

Nations at the 2022 World Games
2022
World Games